The Wonderful World of Andy Williams is the thirteenth studio album by American pop singer Andy Williams and was released by Columbia Records to coincide with the December 31, 1963, broadcast of The Andy Williams Show. Various tracks were recorded with members of his family, including The Williams Brothers, who joined him for a remake of his first top 10 hit, "Canadian Sunset", from 1956.

The album made its first appearance on Billboard magazine's Top LPs chart in the issue dated January 25 of that year and remained there for 24 weeks, peaking at number nine. It received Gold certification from the Recording Industry Association of America on August 17, 1964.

The single from the album, "A Fool Never Learns," made its debut on the Billboard Hot 100 chart on January 11, 1964, eventually reaching number 13 during its 10-week stay. It performed even better on the Easy Listening chart, peaking at number four.

The album was released on compact disc for the first time as one of two albums on one CD by Collectables Records on January 22, 2002, the other album being Williams's Columbia album from February 1962, Danny Boy and Other Songs I Love to Sing. Collectables included this CD in a box set entitled Classic Album Collection, Vol. 2, which contains 15 of his studio albums and two compilations and was released on November 29, 2002.

Track listing

Side one
 "Canadian Sunset"  performed with The Williams Brothers  (Norman Gimbel, Eddie Heywood) – 2:32
 "Sing a Rainbow"  performed with The Williams Family Children  (Arthur Hamilton) – 2:40
 "Dream"  performed with The Williams Brothers  (Johnny Mercer) – 2:40
 "This Is All I Ask" (Gordon Jenkins) – 3:19
 "Wives and Lovers" (Burt Bacharach, Hal David) – 2:20
 "First Born"  performed with The Entire Williams Family  (John Lehman, Jerry Reed) – 2:41

Side two
 "A Fool Never Learns" (Sonny Curtis) – 2:01
 "Noelle" (Paul Kenny, Edward Pola, George Wyle) – 2:48
 "Pennies from Heaven"  performed with The Williams Brothers  (Johnny Burke, Arthur Johnston) – 3:32
 "September Song" (Maxwell Anderson, Kurt Weill) – 3:00
 "Let It Be Me"  performed with Claudine Longet  (Gilbert Bécaud, Mann Curtis, Pierre Delanoë) – 2:51
 "Softly, As I Leave You" (Giorgio Calabrese, Tony De Vita, Hal Shaper) – 3:13

Recording dates
From the liner notes for the 2002 Collectables CD:

January 13, 1963 – "Softly, As I Leave You"
November 1, 1963 – "A Fool Never Learns"
November 7, 1963 – "This Is All I Ask", "First Born", "Noelle", "September Song"
November 27, 1963 – "Canadian Sunset"
December 3, 1963 – "Sing a Rainbow", "Dream", "Wives and Lovers", "Pennies from Heaven", "Let It Be Me"

Personnel
From the liner notes for the original album:

Andy Williams – vocals
The Williams Brothers – vocals
Claudine Longet – vocals
Robert Mersey – arranger, conductor, producer
Frank Bez – photography
Parker of Vienna, Inc. – sweaters

References

Bibliography

1964 albums
Andy Williams albums
Columbia Records albums